Bernard Brockenbrough Semmes was a Virginia lawyer and the mayor of Newport News, Virginia from September 1, 1912 to September 1, 1916.

Biography
Semmes was born in Lexington, Virginia on September 22, 1864.  He graduated from the Virginia Military Institute and obtained a law degree from Washington and Lee University School of Law. He served one term as mayor of Newport News, Virginia, before dying in Newport News in 1917.

References
 

1864 births
1917 deaths
Mayors of Newport News, Virginia
Brockenbrough family of Virginia
Virginia lawyers
People from Lexington, Virginia
Virginia Military Institute alumni
Washington and Lee University School of Law alumni
20th-century American politicians
20th-century American lawyers